"Self Destructor" is a song by American rock band Chevelle. The song was released as the lead single from the band's ninth studio album Niratias. The single reached no. 1 on the Billboard Mainstream Rock chart, becoming the band's sixth song to do so, and 35th on the Billboard Alternative Airplay chart. This track is included in the 2021 film, Hitman's Wife's Bodyguard. James LaBrie called it his favorite song of 2021.

Composition
In an interview with Loudwire, frontman Pete Loeffler stated that the song was written in 2019 and is about science deniers.

Track listing

Charts

Weekly charts

Year-end charts

References

2021 songs
2021 singles
Chevelle (band) songs
Epic Records singles